Mimopeus elongatus is a species of darkling beetle in the subfamily tenebrioninae, first described by Brème in 1842, who considered it a type of Celibe.

The species is found on the coast of the North Island of New Zealand in sand dunes, amongst Muehlenbeckia complexa and boulders on beaches, or around boulders in the Auckland volcanic field. The beetles are a reddish brown or black colour, with a shiny underside, with adults measuring approximately 11-15mm in length and 5.3-7.3mm in width. The species is predated upon by the polynesian rat and brown rats.

References

Tenebrionidae
Beetles described in 1842
Beetles of New Zealand